Harry Chantry (21 November 1885 – 26 March 1971) was an English professional footballer who played as a winger.

References

1885 births
1971 deaths
People from Caistor
English footballers
Association football wingers
Grimsby Rovers F.C. players
Grimsby Town F.C. players
Grimsby Rangers F.C. players
Scunthorpe United F.C. players
Rotherham Town F.C. (1899) players
English Football League players